Veli-Pekka Ketola (born 28 March 1948) is a Finnish former professional ice hockey player and coach.

Playing career

Veli-Pekka Ketola played in the Finnish League, World Hockey Association, and National Hockey League. While Ketola was playing for the Ässät of the Finnish League, he won the league scoring twice in 1971 and 1978 and was a six-time all-star.

In 1974, Ketola went to North America to play for the Winnipeg Jets of the World Hockey Association. He played just over two and a half seasons, from 1974–75 to 1976–77, for the Jets and he played the last 17 games of the 1976–77 WHA season for the Calgary Cowboys. After those three years in the WHA, he returned to Finland to once again play for the Ässät Pori. Despite being signed by the Vancouver Canucks on 6 March 1979, he didn't play for a North American team again until he played 44 games for the Colorado Rockies of the NHL during the 1981–82 season.

Coaching career
Veli-Pekka Ketola coached Ässät Pori of the Finnish League from 1993–94 season to 1996–97 season's first six games. He returned to coaching in March 1999 to replace fired Esko Nokelainen. In addition to coaching Ketola was also Ässät General Manager from 1994–95 season to end of season 1999–00.

Season 2003–04 he was briefly the head coach of Austrian EHC Linz. He returned to Ässät Pori as a senior adviser for season 2013–14 and the following season. 2015 and 2016 he was a Team Manager of Finnish U20 National Team in the World Junior Championship games.

Honours and accolades
General manager of the U20 Finnish team in 2016.
Six-time all-star in Finland.
Elected to the Finnish Ice Hockey Hall of Fame in 1990 as a player.
Won the Finnish Champion (Kanada-malja) in 1964–65, 1970–71 and 1977–78.
Won the Avco World Trophy in 1975–76.
Won the Best Hockey Player of Finland Trophy in 1974 and 1978.
Won the Matti Keinonen trophy in 1978–79.
His number 13 was retired by Porin Ässät.
He won the Veli-Pekka Ketola trophy the year it was introduced (1978).
Led the Finnish League in scoring in 1971.
Ketola played as the Captain on Finland national team for the first two Canada Cup tournaments in 1976 and 1981.

Career statistics

Regular season and playoffs

International

References

External links

1948 births
Living people
Sportspeople from Pori
Finnish ice hockey centres
Ässät players
Ässät coaches
Calgary Cowboys players
Colorado Rockies (NHL) players
KalPa players
Karhut Pori players
Ice hockey players at the 1968 Winter Olympics
Ice hockey players at the 1972 Winter Olympics
Olympic ice hockey players of Finland
Winnipeg Jets (WHA) players
Ice hockey players with retired numbers